Tunisha Sharma (4 January 2002 – 24 December 2022) was an Indian television and film actress. She made her acting debut with Bharat Ka Veer Putra – Maharana Pratap as Chand Kawar in 2015. Sharma is best known for having played Rajkumari Ahankara in Chakravartin Ashoka Samrat, Zara/Babli in Ishq Subhan Allah and Aadhya Verma in Internet Wala Love.

Sharma made her film debut with Fitoor playing Young Firdaus and later played Young Diya in Baar Baar Dekho. In both these films, she played Katrina Kaif's younger version.

Early life
Sharma was born on 4 January 2002 in Chandigarh to Vanita Sharma. In her initial years of work, she was diagnosed with depression and anxiety issues.

Career
Sharma started her career with Sony Entertainment Television's Maharana Pratap as Chand Kanwar. She went on to play Rajkumari Ahankara in Colors TV's Chakravartin Ashoka Samrat. In 2016, she made her film debut as Young Firdaus in Fitoor. In the same year, she played Young Dia in Baar Baar Dekho and Mini in Kahaani 2: Durga Rani Singh.

In 2017, Sharma played Mehtab Kaur in Sher-e-Punjab: Maharaja Ranjit Singh. From 2018 to 2019, she played Aadhya Verma in Colors TV's Internet Wala Love.

In 2019, she appeared in Zee TV's Ishq Subhan Allah as Zara/Babli. In 2021, she was seen in season 2 of SAB TV's Hero – Gayab Mode On as ASP Aditi. In 2022, she played the lead role in Sony SAB show Ali Baba: Dastaan-E-Kabul opposite Sheezan Mohammed Khan.

She is slated to appear posthumously in Abbas–Mustan's film 3 Monkeys.

Death
On 24 December 2022, in a studio in Naigaon, Maharashtra, Sharma hanged herself in the make-up room of co-star Sheezan Mohammed Khan on the set of the television serial Ali Baba: Dastaan-E-Kabul. She was taken to a hospital where she was declared dead on arrival. Sheezan Mohammed Khan was booked for abetment to suicide and was arrested after her mother filed a case against him; Sharma and Khan had reportedly been in a relationship but had broken up shortly before her death.

Filmography

Television

Special appearances

Films

Music videos

References

External links

 

2002 births
2022 deaths
2022 suicides
Actresses from Chandigarh
Actresses in Hindi cinema
Child actresses in Hindi cinema
21st-century Indian actresses
Female suicides
Suicides by hanging in India